Domenico Majocchi (1849–1929) was an Italian dermatologist, an histologist and anatomo-pathologist of great value and an extremely expert clinician, who discovered some pathologies such as the purpura annularis telangiectodes (commonly known as Majocchi's disease) and the Fungal folliculitis (also known as "Majocchi granuloma").

Biography 
Domenico Majocchi was born on 5 August 1849 in Roccalvecce, near Viterbo, by Pietro, a local doctor, and by Virginia Tomasetti. He graduated in the faculty of medicine of the Sapienza university of Rome on 11 August 1873; the following year he won the competition as a substitute surgeon of the hospitals of Rome and this allowed him to acquire a vast practice of operative medicine. At the same time he began to take an interest in dermatology so he followed the anatomopathological studies of Ferdinand von Hebra, the founder of the modern dermatological clinic, he was hired to the S. Gallicano hospital where he started his career and he manages, in a short time, to mature a high preparation in this specialty, thanks to this, in 1879, he became professor of dermosyphilopathy at the University of Padua. He worked as a professor of dermosyphilopathy at the universities of Parma (1880–92) and Bologna (1892–1924) too. Domenico Majocchi was the first director at Dermatological Clinic of the University of Parma, founded in 1880, where he held a pre-emption to the dermosyphilopathy course, entitled: "The modern direction of dermatology mercé to the progress of pathological anatomy" which represented the manifesto of all his subsequent scientific activity. Majocchi was a passionate and respected researcher in the history of medicine, he promoted the foundation of the Italian Society for the Critical History of Medicine and Natural Sciences, in 1907 together with D. Barduzzi,Domenico Majocchi organised the National Congress in Bologna (1922) and participated in actively teaching in various medical schools. On 29 November 1924, Minister A. Conti established a "school for the special purpose of the history of medicine" lasting four years and open to graduates in medicine and literature, whose direction was entrusted to Majocchi himself. Leaving teaching in 1924 due to having reached the age limit, M. died in Bologna on 7 March 1929.

Medical studies 

First described in 1896 by Majocchi, purpura annularis telangiectodes is a pigmented, purplish rash that occurs most commonly in adolescents and young adults. The disease is characterized by symmetrical, purpuric, telangiectatic and atrophic patches, with a preference for legs and buttocks. Individual lesions tend to fuse to form annular patches and plaques, which are 2 to 20mm in diameter and do not fade with pressure.Although mainly annular, these spots can be linear, starry, or serpentine in shape. The lesions can persist for years and often develop central atrophy. The cause of telangiectode annular purpura is unknown. There is no consistent successful therapy for telangiectode annular purpura. 

Majocchi granuloma can be defined as a deep folliculitis due to a cutaneous dermatophyte infection;  it is caused by a Trichophyton rubrum infection. Majocchi granuloma tends to occur in young women who frequently shave their legs, although Majocchi granuloma is also seen in men. The trigger factor is usually a physical trauma in the area, that involves the rupture of the follicle and consequently the passive introduction of the organism with keratin and necrotic material into the dermis.A second group of individuals who can also acquire Dermatophyte Fungi infections are those affected by immunological disorders, also requiring the antecedent of the trauma as a trigger and being very rare for its systemic spread. The recommended treatment for Majocchi's granuloma is a 4-6 week course of oral antifungal medications.

Writings 
Below is a list of some of his most famous works:

 Domenico Majocchi (1881). La scuole in Milano dalla decadenza dell’impero romano alla fine del secolo 15°: cenni storici. Firenze: Coi Tipi Dell’arte Della Stampa.
 Domenico Majocchi (1896). Intorno al demodex folliculorum nelle ghiandole meibomiane e nei follicoli cigliari dell’ uomo e di alcuni mammiferi e alle lesioni morbose che esso vi genera. Italy.
 Domenico Majocchi (1899). Demodex folliculorum in qualche rara affezione cutanea e speciale reperto del medesimo nei follicoli delle ciglia e delle vibrisse. Italy.
 Domenico Majocchi (1905a). Purpura annularis teleangiectodes. Italy.
 Domenico Majocchi (1905b). Purpura annularis teleangiectodes : memoria. Bologna: Tip. Gamberini E Parmeggiani.
 Domenico Majocchi (1909). Teratoide condro-cisto-papillare della regione periombelicale : nota di teratologia cutanea. Bologna: Tip. Gamberini E Parmeggiani.
 Domenico Majocchi and Bosellini, P.L. (1899). Sull’etiologia del boubas. Italy.
 Domenico Majocchi and Masotti, A. (1931). Esami istologici, praticati dal 1926 al 1929 ... Bologna, Cappelli.
 Domenico Majocchi and Tosi (1856). Del dovere di vietare l’esportazione delle antichità : raccoglierle, conservarle e studiarle poichè esse rivelano la sapienza de’ nostri sommi personaggi e costituiscono la gloria della nazione.

Bibliography 
 
 Arieti S. -Dizionario Biografico Degli Italiani- volume 67 2006 
 Hale E. Purpura annularis telangiectodes of Majocchi. Dermatology Online Journal, 9(4). 2003
 Schwartz R. Majocchi Granuloma. Medscape. 2021

1849 births
1929 deaths
Italian dermatologists
Academic staff of the University of Parma
Academic staff of the University of Bologna